The Football League play-offs for the 2011–12 season (referred to as the npower Football League Play-Offs for sponsorship reasons) were held in May 2012. All finals took place at Wembley Stadium in London.

The play-off semi-finals were played over two legs, contested by the teams who finished in 3rd, 4th, 5th and 6th place in the Football League Championship and League One and the 4th, 5th, 6th and 7th-placed teams in the League Two table. The winners of the semi-finals went through to the finals, with the winner of the final gaining promotion for the following season.

The semi-final matches were played from 3 to 17 May 2012. The finals were held between 19 and 27 May 2012.

Background
The Football League play-offs have been held every year since 1987. They take place for each division following the conclusion of the regular season and are contested by the four clubs finishing below the automatic promotion places.

Championship

Semi-finals
First leg

Second leg

West Ham United won 5–0 on aggregate.

Blackpool won 3–2 on aggregate.

Final

League One

Semi-finals
First leg

Second leg

Sheffield United won 1–0 on aggregate.

Huddersfield Town won 3–2 on aggregate.

Final

League Two

Semi-finals
First leg

Second leg

Crewe Alexandra won 3–2 on aggregate.

Cheltenham Town won 4–1 on aggregate.

Final

References

External links
Football League website
Football League Ups and downs

 
Play-offs
English Football League play-offs
Football League play-offs